This is a list of American state-level prosecutors, often known as district attorneys. In states which hold partisan elections for prosecutorial positions, the party affiliation of each prosecutor is noted.



Alabama 
District attorneys in Alabama are assigned by circuit. There are 41 circuits in the state.

Source:

Alaska 
District attorneys in Alaska are based on the locations of district courts. Some districts share district attorneys, however. Alaskan district attorneys are appointed by the Alaska Attorney General, currently Treg Taylor.

Source:

Arizona 
Each county in Arizona has its own prosecutor, called a county attorney.

Source:

Arkansas 
District attorneys are assigned to Arkansas's 23 judicial circuits. Arkansas's prosecutors are known as Prosecuting Attorneys. Their elections are non-partisan.

Source:

California 
Each county in California has its own prosecutor, known as a district attorney. Their elections are non-partisan.

Source:

Colorado 
District attorneys are assigned to each of Colorado's 22 judicial districts.

Source:

Connecticut 
Prosecutors in Connecticut are known as state's attorneys. Each judicial district is assigned its own state's attorney. They are appointed by a state commission.

Source:

Delaware  
All prosecutions in the state of Delaware are handled by the Attorney General of Delaware. The current Attorney General is Kathy Jennings (D).

Florida 

Florida prosecutors are known as state attorneys and are assigned by circuit.

Source:

Georgia 

District attorneys in Georgia are assigned to its 50 circuits.

Source:

Hawaii 
Hawaii's prosecuting attorneys are assigned by county. Those in Hawaii, Honolulu, and Kauai Counties are elected on a non-partisan basis, while Maui's is appointed.

Idaho 
Prosecuting attorneys in Idaho are assigned by county.

Source:

Illinois

Illinois prosecutors are known as state's attorneys. They are assigned by county.

Source:

Indiana
Indiana's prosecutors, known as prosecuting attorneys, are elected to the state's 91 judicial circuits. Each circuit, with one exception, covers a single county.

Source:

Iowa
Iowa's prosecutors are known as county attorneys. Two county attorneys serve two counties, while the rest serve one.

Source:

Kansas
Kansas prosecutors are elected by county, although some prosecutors serve multiple counties. Most are called county attorneys, but six are designated as district attorneys.

Source:

Kentucky

Kentucky prosecutors, known as Commonwealth's Attorneys, are assigned by circuit.

Source:

Louisiana

Louisiana prosecutors are elected by district.

Source:

Maine
Maine's prosecutors are elected by district.

Source:

Maryland

Maryland's prosecutors are known as state's attorneys and are assigned by county.

Source:

Massachusetts
Massachusetts's district attorneys are elected in districts, two of which include multiple counties.

Michigan
Michigan's prosecuting attorneys are assigned by county.

Source:

Minnesota
Minnesota prosecutors are assigned by county and known as county attorneys. Their elections are non-partisan.

Source:

Mississippi
Mississippi prosecutors are assigned by circuit.

Source:

Missouri
Missouri's prosecutors are known as prosecuting attorneys and serve a single county.

Source:

Montana
Montana prosecutors are known as county attorneys. 54 out of 56 counties elect their prosecutors, with 2/3 holding partisan elections.

Source:

Nebraska
Nebraska prosecutors are known as county attorneys. Though each attorney technically serves a single county, attorneys elected in one county are sometimes appointed to serve in others

Source:

Nevada
Nevada district attorneys are elected by county.

Source:

New Hampshire
New Hampshire prosecutors are known as county attorneys.

Source:

New Jersey
New Jersey prosecutors are appointed by the Governor and confirmed by the state senate. They are assigned by county.

Source:

New Mexico
New Mexico district attorneys are assigned by district.

Source:

New York

Source:

North Carolina
North Carolina elects its district attorneys in multi-county districts.

Source:

North Dakota
North Dakota assigns state's attorneys by county. Their elections are non-partisan, while two counties (Golden Valley and Steele) appoint their prosecutors.

Source:

Ohio
Ohio assigns prosecuting attorneys by county.

Source:

Oklahoma
Oklahoma assigns its district attorneys by district.

Source:

Oregon
Oregon assigns district attorneys by county. Their elections are non-partisan.

Source:

Pennsylvania
Pennsylvania assigns district attorneys by county.

Source:

Rhode Island
All prosecutions in the state of Rhode Island are handled by the Attorney General of Rhode Island. The current Attorney General is Peter Neronha (D).

South Carolina

South Carolina prosecutors are known as solicitors. They are assigned by judicial circuit.

Source:

South Dakota
South Dakota assigns state's attorneys by county. Four pairs of counties share a state's attorney.

Source:

Tennessee
Tennessee elects district attorneys by judicial district.

Source:

Texas 
Texas prosecutors cover districts that include multiple counties, single counties, or even parts of counties. They can be known as "District Attorneys" or "County Attorneys."

District Attorneys

County Attorneys 

Source:

Utah 
Utah assigns district attorneys by county. They are called "County Attorneys."

Source:

Vermont 
Vermont prosecutors are known as "State's Attorneys." They are assigned by county.

Source:

Virginia 
Virginia prosecutors are known as "Commonwealth's Attorneys." Most are assigned by county or independent city, although some independent cities lack their own prosecutor.

Source:

Washington 

Washington assigns district attorneys by county. They are known as "Prosecuting Attorneys."

Source:

West Virginia 
West Virginia assigns district attorneys by county. They are known as "Prosecuting Attorneys."

Source:

Wisconsin
Wisconsin assigns district attorneys by county.

Source:

Wyoming
Wyoming assigns district attorneys by county, who are thus known as "County Attorneys."

Source:

References

External links
 Prosecutor.info

United States law-related lists